Irish security forces refer to the various security forces of the Republic of Ireland. Among other roles, they carry out efforts to undermine the ongoing dissident Irish republican campaign since the Troubles. They consist of the following organisations;

Department of Defence
 Defence Forces
 Army
 Army Ranger Wing (ARW)
 Ordnance Corps Explosive Ordnance Disposal (EOD)
 Air Corps
 Naval Service
 Directorate of Military Intelligence
 National Security Intelligence Section (NSIS)
 Defence Intelligence Section
 Communications and Information Services Corps (CIS) SIGINT
 Military Police Corps

Department of Justice
 Garda Síochána
 Crime and Security Branch (CSB)
 Special Detective Unit (SDU)
 Emergency Response Unit (ERU)
 National Surveillance Unit (NSU)
 Airport Police Service
 Dublin Harbour Police
 Dún Laoghaire Harbour Police

Department of Finance
 Revenue Commissioners
 Customs

Department of the Environment, Climate and Communications
 National Cyber Security Centre

Department of Enterprise, Trade and Employment
 Director of Corporate Enforcement

See also 
 National Security Committee (NSC)
 Law enforcement in Ireland
 Law enforcement in the Republic of Ireland

Law enforcement agencies of Ireland